Jackson Township is the name of 3 townships in the U.S. state of Oklahoma:

 Jackson Township, Coal County, Oklahoma
 Jackson Township, Cotton County, Oklahoma
 Jackson Township, Washington County, Oklahoma

See also 
 Jackson Township (disambiguation)

Oklahoma township disambiguation pages